Buergerocaris is an extinct genus of shrimp, containing only one species, Buergerocaris psittacoides.

References

Caridea
Jurassic crustaceans
Monotypic arthropod genera
Fossil taxa described in 2004
Fossils of Germany